Yang Yuting may refer to:

Yang Yuting (warlord) (1886–1929), Chinese warlord of the Fengtian clique
Yang Yuting (martial artist) (1887–1982), Chinese teacher of Wu-style t'ai chi ch'uan